Overdressed is the eighth major studio release from Caedmon's Call, released in August 2007. It features collaboration with former member and successful solo artist Derek Webb. If the album is ordered through Caedmon's Call's website, you can order the Limited Edition, which has two additional tracks.

Track listing
 "Trouble" – 3:36 (Derek Webb)
 "Need Your Love" – 3:09 (Andrew Osenga)
 "Sacred" – 3:25 (Osenga, Randall Goodgame)
 "Expectations" – 3:21 (Osenga, Goodgame)
 "There is a Reason" – 3:46 (Osenga, Goodgame)
 "Share in the Blame" – 3:40 (Webb)
 "Hold the Light" – 6:00 (Osenga, Goodgame)
 "Two Weeks in Africa" – 3:44 (Osenga)
 "Love Grows Love" – 3:59 (Osenga)
 "All Across the Western World" – 3:01 (Webb, Sandra McCracken)
 "Always Been There" – 2:37 (Osenga, Goodgame)
 "Start Again" – 3:56 (Osenga, Goodgame)
 "Love" (Limited Edition Bonus Track) – 3:44 (Osenga, Goodgame)
 "Ten Thousand Angels" (Limited Edition Bonus Track) – 4:18 (McCracken)

References 

2007 albums
Caedmon's Call albums
INO Records albums